Stellar Conquest is a science fiction board game designed by Howard M. Thompson that was published in 1974. It is a prototype of the 4X strategy game genre.

The game was rejected by the Avalon Hill Company in 1973, and was published the following year as the first release from Thompson's own company, Metagaming Concepts.  It was eventually republished by Avalon Hill in 1984.

The game featured various interstellar ship types represented by counters,  those of which were used to transfer populations around the game's universe, populate planets, and ultimately defeat opponents by slowly improving technology, movement, and offensive capabilities.

The board
The board is a hex grid map, with certain hexes containing stars of varying colors. Stars in a hex may have planets that are suitable for colonization. Blue stars could feature stellar nurseries or areas undergoing accretion, which impedes movement through those hexes.

Basic rules
In Stellar Conquest, at the beginning of a game, each player starts in an opposite corner of the board, each with a number of markers that represent ships of various types. For the first four turns the corner square counts as a populated planet. In addition, all ships may move only two spaces, but it is possible to purchase movement upgrades that improve the rate of travel speed.

Units must follow the quickest path to a named destination, and their destination can be changed only when the route causes the unit to stop on a star hex. The distance that ships of any type may travel will not precede more than eight hexes away from a populated planet that is owned by the same player; this limitation can be rescinded by research.

Research points must be spent on military units (ships that can attack other ships) before they can be built.  A non-military unit unaccompanied by a military unit landing in a star must roll a d6 (standard six-sided die), and is destroyed on a roll of one.

When a player's piece lands on a star, the star's ability to sustain life is randomly determined, the chance of success is dependent on the color of the star. Upgrades may improve a planet's ability to sustain life.

Every four turns a "production phase" occurs in which planetary populations increase by one-fifth their current population number. Any player may move population units into CTs, and earn Industrial Unit Output (IUO), the currency with which players purchase upgrades and extra ships. 

The number of ships a player begins with depends upon the number of players, the scenario, and the preferences of the players.

Alternate building options
In addition to offensive spacecraft used off-world, players can opt to build stationary Missile Bases (MBs) and Advanced Missile Bases (AMBs). Essentially acting in the same manner as a grounded starship (that is, with particular combat statistics) it is immobile and remains on the planet it was built on. Since Missile Bases are inexpensive compared to the equivalent starship, they may provide an economical way to defend a player's planets.

Reception
Writing for Moves, game designer Richard Berg called it "far and away the best sci-fi game on the market. The basic game is simple, yet effective, and the advanced game and optional rules are quite intelligent and intriguing."

Kelly Moorman reviewed Stellar Conquest in The Space Gamer No. 6. Moorman commented that "in the interests of fair play, I think I should point out that in a basic game of Stellar Conquest, Player #3 has a distinct advantage over the other players regarding the amount of intelligence he can accumulate and utilize in making the decision about where to place his first colony -- which is one of the most vital decisions in the game for any player, no matter what his position." Moorman commented in a second review in The Space Gamer No. 6 that "One obvious fault in the rules and play of Stellar Conquest is the fact that all of the other players can 'see' the other player's units, even though they don't know the types or numbers of the units. Of course, the entire form of play must be changed, and actually should be, in order to achieve maximum realism in playing SC.

David Ritchie reviewed Stellar Conquest in Ares Magazine #1, rating it a 7 out of 9. Ritchie called it "The classic game of inter-stellar system warfare. [...] After five years and three printings, the game remains almost as fresh and exciting as the day it was published. Somewhat complex and long, but can be completed in an afternoon."

Tony Watson reviewed the Avalon Hill version of Stellar Conquest in Space Gamer No. 76. Watson commented that "In summation, with some very minor changes in terms of play, the new edition of SC brings back a true classic in the field of sf boardgames. [...] Even after a decade, this remains a superb game, a must for every space gamer's shelf."

John Lambshead in White Dwarf #22 (December 1980 – January 1981) gave it a 9, and said "This is undoubtably the best game of its kind that I have ever played".

Awards
At the 1976 Origins Awards, Stellar Conquest was a finalist for the Charles S. Roberts Award in the category "Best Amateur Game of 1975".

Other reviews
The Boardgamer Vol.5 #2
 Casus Belli #30 (Jan 1986)
Isaac Asimov's Science Fiction Magazine v10 n6 (1986 06)
Games & Puzzles #69

Impact
The game is credited with influence on early computer 4X games such as Reach for the Stars, Anacreon, Stellar Crusade, and Master of Orion. Stellar Conquest was ported into a computer game itself as Armada 2525. There is also the 1994 shareware game Stellar Conquest III: Hostile Takeover which became open source Freeware in 2006.

References

External links
 

Board games introduced in 1974
Metagaming Concepts games
Science fiction board wargames